Karol Rusznyák (born 26 November 1967) is a Slovak ice hockey player. He competed in the men's tournament at the 1998 Winter Olympics.

Career statistics

Regular season and playoffs

International

References

External links
 

1967 births
Living people
Olympic ice hockey players of Slovakia
Ice hockey players at the 1998 Winter Olympics
Ice hockey people from Bratislava
HK Dukla Trenčín players
HC Dynamo Pardubice players
ETC Crimmitschau players
Fehérvár AV19 players
Grizzlys Wolfsburg players
HC Košice players
HC Slovan Bratislava players
HC Tábor players
HK Trnava players
Slovak ice hockey centres
Czechoslovak ice hockey centres
Expatriate ice hockey players in Hungary
Expatriate ice hockey players in Austria
Slovak expatriate ice hockey players in the Czech Republic
Slovak expatriate sportspeople in Hungary
Slovak expatriate sportspeople in Austria
Slovak expatriate ice hockey players in Germany